Maundrell is a surname. Notable people with the surname include:

Henry Maundrell (1665–1701), English travel writer
William Maundrell (1876–1958), English cricketer

See also
Mandrell